Neostacheoceratidae is one of three families of the Cyclolobaceae superfamily. They are an extinct group of ammonoid, which are shelled cephalopods related to squids, belemnites, octopuses, and cuttlefish, and more distantly to the nautiloids.

The following genera are included:
Glassoceratinae Ruzhencev, 1960
 Glassoceras
 Neoglassoceras
 Subglassoceras
Nostacheoceratinae Toumansky, 1939
 Chengxianites
 Furnishites
 Martoceras
 Neostacheoceras
 Stacheoceras
 Waagenina

References
 The Paleobiology Database accessed on 10/01/07

Goniatitida families
Cyclolobaceae